Bas-Mono is a prefecture located in the Maritime Region of Togo.

Canton (administrative divisions) of Bas-Mono include Afagnagan, Agomé-Glouzou, Attitogon, Afagnan-Gbléta, Hompou, Agbétiko, and Kpétsou.

References 

Prefectures of Togo